James Store is an unincorporated community in Gloucester County, Virginia, United States. James Store had a post office, which closed on September 7, 1996.

References

Unincorporated communities in Gloucester County, Virginia
Unincorporated communities in Virginia